Fritzschia is a genus of flowering plants in the family Melastomataceae, native to the Atlantic coastal forest of Brazil. They are sprawling or erect shrubs, with their branchlets and their hypanthia coated with either glandular or villose trichomes.

Species
Species accepted by Plants of the World Online  were:
Fritzschia anisostemon Cham.
Fritzschia furnensis R.Romero & M.J.Rocha
Fritzschia erecta Cham.
Fritzschia integrifolia Cham.

Other species in Fritzschia may include: 
Fritzschia almedae A.B.Martins
Fritzschia atropurpurea  D.Nunes, M.J.R.Rocha & P.J.F.Guim.
Fritzschia cordifolia R.Romero, D.Nunes & M.J.R.Rocha
Fritzschia edmundoi (Brade) M.J.R.Rocha & P.J.F.Guim.
Fritzschia lanceiflora (DC.) M.J.R.Rocha & P.J.F.Guim.
Fritzschia recubans Glaz.
Fritzschia rupestris R.Pacifico, Almeda & D.Nunes
Fritzschia sertularia (DC.) M.J.Rocha & P.J.F.Guim..
Fritzschia sessilis (Spreng.) M.J.Rocha & P.J.F.Guim.
Fritzschia stenodon (Naudin) M.J.Rocha & P.J.F.Guim.

References

Melastomataceae
Melastomataceae genera